The Squirrels is a British television sitcom created by Eric Chappell. It was produced by ATV for the ITV and broadcast from 1974 to 1977 running for 3 series and 28 episodes. Chappell later created the Yorkshire Television sitcoms Rising Damp, among other series.

Plot and background
The theme was office politics in the accounts department of a fictitious TV rental company. Little work was seen to be done as the staff were usually skiving or engaging in office romances. Bernard Hepton played Mr Fletcher, the authoritarian boss who also saw himself as a 'ladies man' and Ken Jones played Rex, an unassertive subordinate.

Phil Redmond, the creator of the soap opera Brookside, was also a writer for the series. The scripts written by Eric Chappell formed the basis of a remake, Fiddlers Three, broadcast in 1991.

Cast
 Bernard Hepton as Mr Fletcher
 Ken Jones as Rex
 Patsy Rowlands as Susan
 Alan David as Harry
 Ellis Jones as Burke
 Karin MacCarthy as Carol

Episodes

Pilot (1974)

Series 1 (1975)

Series 2 (1976)

Series 3 (1976–77)

Archive status and home release
Surviving episodes of The Squirrels were released by Network DVD in the UK (Region 2) on 29 April 2013. This set the existing 22 episodes (out of 28). Scripts for some of the missing episodes are included in .pdf format on disc one. The missing episodes are the pilot, 1/1, 1/5, 1/6, and 1/7. The rest of the first series survives only in inferior recordings to the original video format, either re-converted from NTSC copies (1/2, 1/3) or as a domestic videotape (1/4).

References

External links
 

1970s British sitcoms
1970s British workplace comedy television series
1974 British television series debuts
1977 British television series endings
English-language television shows
ITV sitcoms
Television shows produced by Associated Television (ATV)